Jiaxing railway station is a railway station located in Nanhu District, Jiaxing, Zhejiang, People's Republic of China, on the Shanghai–Kunming railway. It handles all non-high-speed rail services for Jiaxing City.  High-speed trains arrive at and depart from Jiaxing South railway station.

The station has 13 ticket windows, 6 VIP lounges, one quiet waiting room, one soft-seat waiting room, and 4 normal waiting rooms.

In 2007, Jiaxing railway station handled 31.1 million passengers and 28.5 million tons of cargo.

History
Use of the station commenced in 1909, and in 1976, the facilities were modernized. In 2008, more work was carried out to improve and expand the station.

The station was temporarily closed in May 2020, and was reopened on 25 June 2021.

Connections 
The station is served by the Jiaxing Tram in January 2022.

References 

Railway stations in Zhejiang
Stations on the Shanghai–Kunming Railway
Railway stations in China opened in 1909
Jiaxing